The Patom Highlands are a mountainous area in Eastern Siberia, Russia. Administratively most of the territory of the uplands is part of Irkutsk Oblast, with a smaller section in northern Transbaikal Krai.

There are large deposits of gold in Bodaybo and Artyomovsky. Besides these two towns, other inhabited localities of the mountain region are: Mama, Perevoz, Kropotkin, Svetly and Bolshoy Patom, Bodaybinsky District.

History
In 1912 there was a massacre of striking workers of the Lena Goldfields, located in the Patom Highlands between the Lena and Vitim rivers. Strikers were protesting about harsh working conditions. Soldiers of the Imperial Russian Army intervened and fired upon protesters, causing hundreds of casualties. The incident provoked wide outrage across pre-revolutionary Russia when Alexander Kerensky reported it in the Duma.

The name of the highlands was first proposed by Peter Kropotkin in 1868.

Geography 
The Patom Highlands are bound by rivers Lena, Vitim and Chara. To the north the valley of the Lena separates the highlands from the Lena Plateau and to the southwest the Vitim River, a right tributary of the Lena, separates it from the Stanovoy and North Baikal Highlands. To the south rises the Kropotkin Range and beyond it the valley of the Vitim. To the east flows the Chara River, a left tributary of the Olyokma River of the Lena basin, which separates the highland area from the Olyokma-Chara Plateau. To the southeast the Patom Highlands connect with the Kodar Range of Transbaikalia.

the river valleys cutting across the highlands are usually deep. Many rivers have their sources in the highlands, including some right tributaries of the Vitim, left tributaries of the Chara, such as the Zhuya and Malba, and right tributaries of Lena, such as the Big Patom and Little Patom Rivers.

The Patom crater is a cone of crushed limestone blocks located on the slopes of the Patom Highlands.

Climate and flora
The climate prevailing in the upland is extreme continental and cold.

Further up the mountaintops are covered with stony tundra.

See also
Lena Goldfields massacre
Lena Gold Mining Partnership

References

External links

Patom Highlands- Encyclopedia of Transbaikalia

South Siberian Mountains
Mountains of Russia
Landforms of Irkutsk Oblast
Landforms of Zabaykalsky Krai